Bo Staffan Scheja (born 25 April 1950) is a Swedish pianist and professor. Scheja started studying piano at the age of nine and made his concert debut at the age of 14 with the Sveriges Radios symfoniorkester. He also performed with the Royal Stockholm Philharmonic Orchestra. He studied at the Royal College of Music in Stockholm 1964–1969 and 1969–1972 at the Juilliard School in New York with pianists Rosina Lhévinne, Ilona Kabos and Ania Dorfmann. In 1975, he was the awardee at the international Ferruccio Busoni International Piano Competition in Bolzano. For a number of years he lived in the US and performed in concerts at Carnegie Hall and at several head of state visits by Swedish dignitaries to the US.

He is a professor of piano and also prorector at the Royal College of Music since 1997 and has held a chair at the Royal Swedish Academy of Music since 2001. He founded and was artistic director for the Gotland Chamber Music Festival, held annually at Gotland since the 1980s. He is also the director of the Gotland Baltic Music Academy. In 2010 Scheja performed at the Pianomusik på Konstakademien, a special session at the Konstakademien in Stockholm.

In 1995, he was awarded the Litteris et Artibus, and he has received several Swedish Grammis awards. In 2008, he was a participant in the Sveriges Television 2009 series Stjärnorna på slottet along with four other Swedish celebrities. In the series he had a well-publicized feud with comedian Jonas Gardell when Scheja tried to teach Gardell how to play the violin. In August 2010, he was presenter of an episode of the Sveriges Radio series Sommar i P1.

Family
Staffan Scheja is the father of Swedish DJ Rebecca Scheja.

References

External links 

Living people
1950 births
Swedish classical pianists
Male classical pianists
Piano pedagogues
People of the Royal Stockholm Philharmonic Orchestra
People from Danderyd Municipality
Academic staff of the Royal College of Music, Stockholm
Royal College of Music, Stockholm alumni
Juilliard School alumni
Litteris et Artibus recipients
Participants in Swedish reality television series
Members of the Royal Swedish Academy of Music